John Fitzjames may refer to:

 Sir John FitzJames, Lord Chief Justice of the King's Bench, 1526–1539
 Sir John Fitzjames (MP), English politician